Vasilievca may refer to several places in Moldova:

, a village in Cocieri Commune, Dubăsari district
Vasilievca, a village in Sovetscoe Commune, Transnistria

See also 
 Vasile (name)
 Vasiliu (surname)
 Vasilescu (surname)